The Rio Claro Araponga (Brazilian Portuguese name for the Neotropical bellbird), was a single-seat sailplane of high-wing.

Design and development
In 1983, a group of aviators from the Rio Claro aero club decided to hire Sílvio de Oliveira, an aeronautical engineer, to develop a high performance monoplace glider. Initially it was planned to build two copies, the resources were pooled among the members.  With classic lines and entirely built in native wood, with a plywood outer cover, it had conventional landing gear flaps formed by a fixed skid and a fixed roller, semi-embedded on the fuselage and fixed skid under the tail.

Specifications

See also
 List of Brazilian gliders

Notes

References

External links
Rio Claro Air Club website 

1980s Brazilian civil aircraft
1980s Brazilian sailplanes
Aircraft first flown in 1985
High-wing aircraft